Food Safari is an Australian television food series presented by Maeve O'Meara and produced by Kismet Productions in association with SBS TV Australia, and explores the cuisines brought to Australia by its immigrants. From seasons 1 to 4, each episode covered a cuisine from a particular culture, including commonly used ingredients and where to obtain them in Australia, the preparation and consumption of 'popular favourites', basic dishes and desserts/sweets. Seasons five to seven, whilst still covering Australian cuisine, focused on the basic elements involved in food preparation, with Food Safari Fire consisting of barbecuing, grilling and smoking of meat and vegetables, Food Safari Earth consisting of vegetarian dishes and focusing on European fermentation and preservation of vegetables, and Food Safari Water which focused on seafood.

The series garnered two spin-off seasons, Italian Food Safari and French Food Safari, which first aired in 2010 and 2011, respectively. In both seasons, O'Meara is joined by a chef experienced in the food of that culture, with Guy Grossi co-presenting in Italian Food Safari and french-born Australian chef, Guillaume Brahimi sharing the presenting duties in French Food Safari.

Food Safari was commissioned for a fourth series which began on February 14, 2013. An episode featuring bush tucker went to air on 4 March 2013. A fifth season began airing from January 7, 2016. A sixth season began airing from October 12, 2017.

Series overview

Episodes

Series 1 (2006-07)

Series 2 (2007-08)

Series 3 (2008-09)

Series 4 (2013)

Fire: Series 5 (2016)

Earth: Series 6 (2017)

Water: Series 7 (2018)

Spin-off series

Italian Food Safari (2010)

French Food Safari (2011)

Home media

References

External links 
 Food Safari website on SBS.com.au
 Interview with Maeve O'Meara

Special Broadcasting Service original programming
Australian cooking television series
2006 Australian television series debuts
2010s Australian television series
Works about human migration